These are the results of the men's floor competition, one of eight events for male competitors in artistic gymnastics at the 2000 Summer Olympics in Sydney. The qualification and final rounds took place on September 17 and 24 at the Sydney SuperDome.

Results

Qualification

Seventy-six gymnasts competed in the floor event during the qualification round on September 16.  The eight highest scoring gymnasts advanced to the final on September 24.  Each country was limited to two competitors in the final.

Final

References
Official Olympic Report
www.gymnasticsresults.com

Men's floor
2000
Men's events at the 2000 Summer Olympics